Christian Wolff (born 11 March 1938) is a German film actor. He has appeared in more than 100 films and television shows since 1957.

Selected filmography
 Precocious Youth (1957)
 Court Martial (1959)
 Old Heidelberg (1959)
 The Blue Moth (1959)
 Crime After School (1959)
 Carnival Confession (1960)
 Final Accord (1960)
 Via Mala (1961)
 Lana, Queen of the Amazons (1964)
  (1965, TV miniseries)
 Rheinsberg (1967)
  (1972)
 Derrick - Season 4, Episode 08: "Via Bangkok" (1977)
  (1978, TV film)
 Derrick - Season 10, Episode 3: "Geheimnisse einer Nacht" (1983)
 Forsthaus Falkenau (1989-2006; TV series)

References

External links

1938 births
Living people
German male film actors
German male television actors
20th-century German male actors
21st-century German male actors
Male actors from Berlin